Arslan Asad Butt is a Pakistani actor and model. He is known for his roles in dramas Sara Sajeeda, Dil Diyan Gallan, Main Haar Nahi Manoun Gi, Bharam and Chupke Chupke. He is the recipient of Hum Award for Best Soap Actor for his performance in Naseebon Jali.

Early life
Arslan was born in 1992 on 30th October in Lahore, Pakistan. He completed his studies from Beaconhouse National University.

Career
He started modeling in 2012 and appeared in commercials. Arslan made his debut as an actor in drama Dhol Bajnay Laga as Jamil in 2014. He was noted for his roles in dramas Ghari Do Ghari, Ajnabi Lage Zindagi, Meri Baji and Korangi Ke Satrangi. Arslan also appeared in dramas Main Haar Nahi Manoun Gi, Naseebon Jali, Nalaoq and Aas. Since then he appeared in dramas Sara Sajeeda, Haqeeqat, Aas, Bharam and Chupke Chupke. In 2018 he appeared in movie Parwaaz Hai Junoon.

Filmography

Television

Film

Awards and nominations

References

External links
 
 
 

1990 births
Living people
21st-century Pakistani male actors
Pakistani male television actors
Pakistani male film actors
Male actors in Urdu cinema